David Toews (born June 7, 1990) is a Canadian former professional ice hockey player. He was drafted by the New York Islanders in the 3rd round, 66th overall, in the 2008 NHL Entry Draft. He is the younger brother of Chicago Blackhawks captain Jonathan Toews.

Playing career

Amateur 
At the 2005 WHL Bantam Draft, Toews was selected in the sixth round, 117th overall by the Brandon Wheat Kings. Toews began his career at Shattuck-Saint Mary's with its Tier I Bantam team.During his first season with the prep team at Shattuck-Saint Mary's, Toews was named to the Manitoba roster for the ice hockey tournament at the 2007 Canada Games. There, he helped the team to their best finish in the tournament's history, losing 6–4 to Ontario in the gold-medal game.

In the off-season before his final year at Shattuck-Saint Mary's, Toews gave a verbal commitment to attend the University of North Dakota and play for the North Dakota Fighting Sioux men's ice hockey team beginning in the 2008–09 season.

Heading into the 2008 NHL Entry Draft, Toews was ranked 79th among North American skaters by the NHL Central Scouting Bureau. He had previously been ranked 71st among North American skaters in January 2008. On June 21, 2008, Toews was drafted in the third round, 66th overall by the New York Islanders.

Professional 
On September 9, 2011, the Chicago Blackhawks acquired Toews from the New York Islanders for future considerations. On September 23, 2011, the Blackhawks assigned Toews to the Rockford IceHogs of the AHL. The IceHogs loaned Toews to the Toledo Walleye of the ECHL on October 13, 2011. Toews signed a one-year contract with the Bakersfield Condors for the 2012–13 season. In January Toews was placed on waivers and claimed by the Idaho Steelheads.  On September 4, 2013 Toews signed a contract with the Reading Royals.

International play
Toews' first experience with Hockey Canada came as a member of the national under-18 team when, on August 8, 2007, he was named to the roster for the 2007 Ivan Hlinka Memorial Tournament. Toews recorded one assist in four games played through the tournament as Canada was defeated 5–4 by Russia in the bronze-medal game.

Career statistics

Regular season and playoffs

International

References

External links

1990 births
Living people
Bakersfield Condors (1998–2015) players
Brandon Wheat Kings players
Canadian ice hockey centres
Canadian people of French descent
Franco-Manitoban people
Idaho Steelheads (ECHL) players
New York Islanders draft picks
North Dakota Fighting Hawks men's ice hockey players
Ice hockey people from Winnipeg
Toledo Walleye players
Utah Grizzlies (ECHL) players